Huillé-Lézigné is a commune in the Maine-et-Loire department in western France. It was established on 1 January 2019 by merger of the former communes of Lézigné (the seat) and Huillé.

See also
Communes of the Maine-et-Loire department

References

Communes of Maine-et-Loire